Chlorocoris hebetatus is a species of stink bug in the family Pentatomidae. It is found in Central America and North America.

References

Further reading

External links

 

Insects described in 1890
Pentatomini